Lorenz Knöferl (born 4 May 2003) is a German professional footballer who plays as a forward for Carl Zeiss Jena on loan from TSV 1860 Munich.

Club career

Early life and youth career 
Lorenz grew up in Alberzell, Bavaria. He began his youth career at TSV Hilgertshausen before moving to JFG TaF Glonntal. He then moved to the academy of TSV 1860 Munich in 2014, and had featured for the club in their under 12 and under 15 division.

1860 Munich 
Lorenz signed his first senior contract with TSV 1860 Munich. He made his debut on 12 December 2020 against Waldhof Mannheim as a substitute for Stefan Lex on 72 minute of the game. The match ended 5–0 with 1860 Munich taking the win. Lorenz played the next against 1. FC Kaiserslautern on 15 December 2020 as a substitute for Fabian Greilinger. The match ended on a 3–0 scoreline with 1860 Munich taking the three points. Lorenz came in as a substitute for Dennis Dressel in the next match on 18 December 2020 against SV Wehen Wiesbaden, where he scored his debut goal for 1860 Munich and his maiden senior career goal in less than one minute after coming into the pitch in 83rd minute, thereby taking the match to a 2–2 draw. Lorenz thus became the youngest goal scorer in the history of 1860 Munich.

Loan to Carl Zeiss Jena
On 31 January 2023, Knöferl was loaned by Carl Zeiss Jena in Regionalliga Nordost.

International career 
Lorenz was called up for Germany U16 national team on 2018. He made his debut against Austria U16 on 9 September 2018. He made three appearances for the national team in 2018.

Personal life 
Lorenz is a fan of French striker Kylian Mbappé.

Career statistics

References 

2003 births
Living people
People from Dachau
Sportspeople from Upper Bavaria
German footballers
Footballers from Bavaria
Association football forwards
3. Liga players
Regionalliga players
TSV 1860 Munich II players
TSV 1860 Munich players
FC Carl Zeiss Jena players